Laura Vinson (born May 23, 1947) is a Canadian folk and country singer-songwriter. Prominent in the 1970s and 1980s as a mainstream country performer, in recent years she has concentrated primarily on recording and performing First Nations and Métis music.

Biography
She is of French, English, Cree, Iroquois and Cherokee descent. Vinson was born in Edmonton, Alberta and raised in Brule. She is a direct descendant of Tête Jaune, a fur trader who played a prominent role in the early development of the Canadian West. She began her music career performing folk music with Bob Ruzicka and rock music with the band Bitter Suite, before turning to country music in 1973 with the band Red Wyng. She released a number of albums on R. Harlan Smith's Royalty Records, and scored hit singles with songs such as "Sweet Mountain Music", "Sun Always Shines", "Mes amis O Canada", "Crazy Heart" and "In My Dreams".

In 1989, she performed on Indian Time, a television special devoted to indigenous music of Canada. Afterward, she began concentrating more strongly on music that reflected her indigenous heritage, releasing several further albums of First Nations and Métis music independently with the band Free Spirit.

Awards and honours
She was a two-time Juno Award nominee for Most Promising Female Vocalist at the Juno Awards of 1980 and the Juno Awards of 1981, and a four-time Juno nominee for Country Female Vocalist of the Year at the Juno Awards of 1981, 1982, 1983 and 1985.

Discography
First Flight (1978) 
High Fashion Queen (1980)
Hootch, Heartache and Hallelujah (1981)
Adios Mexico (1984)
Many Moons Ago (1986)
The Spirit Sings (1989)
Rise Like a Phoenix (1991)
Voices on the Wind (1995)
Point of the Arrow (1999)
It Reminds Me (2000)
Mossbag Lullaby (2006)
Warrior (2013)

References

External links

1947 births
Living people
Canadian folk singer-songwriters
Canadian country singer-songwriters
Canadian women singer-songwriters
Canadian women country singers
Musicians from Edmonton
Métis musicians
Canadian Métis people
20th-century Canadian women singers
21st-century Canadian women singers